Rodiya is a dialect of the Sinhalese language spoken by members of the Rodiya community of Sri Lanka. Speakers are considered to be low-caste among the Sinhalese people.

Examples of Rodiya words:
dissenavā to come (Sinhala enavā)
dumana house (Sinhala geya, gedara)
galla mouth (Sinhala kaṭa)
gävā man (Sinhala minihā)
gävī woman (Sinhala gäänu)
miganavā to eat (Sinhala kanavā)

References

Sinhala language
Languages of Sri Lanka